The City of Edmonton, Alberta, Canada, has been the birthplace or a significant home to numerous famous individuals. Additionally, many Edmontonians have become worthy of note through their various charitable activities, donations, and contributions.

National service 
 Wop May, Canadian flying ace in World War I, the last pilot to be pursued by Manfred von Richthofen, the Red Baron, prior to his death, also a celebrated bush pilot.
 Roy Brown (RAF officer), Canadian flying ace in World War I, officially credited with shooting down the Red Baron, though this is now subject to debate.
 Russ Bannock (1919–2020), Canada's second-highest scoring ace of World War II
 Nellie McClung (1873–1951), first woman appointed to the Board of Governors of the CBC (1936); one of The Famous Five
 Emily Murphy (1868–1933), first female magistrate in British Empire and petitioned Supreme Court of Canada to allow women the vote; one of the Famous Five. Additionally, she has received modern scrutiny for her support for eugenics.
 Douglas Roche (born 1929), O.C., former M.P., Senator, U.N. Ambassador, nuclear disarmament figure, author, and journalist
 William Smith Ziegler (1911–1999), artillery commander of the 1st Canadian Division in the Second World War.

Explorers and pioneers 
 Punch Dickins (1899–1995), aviator and bush pilot; the Dickinsfield community was named in his honour

Business 
 Greg Abel (born 1962), CEO Berkshire Hathaway
 Jack Agrios (born 1938), lawyer
 Can Man Dan (born 1987), anti-poverty activist and philanthropist
 Mark Carney (born 1965), Governor of the Bank of England and Chairman of the G20's Financial Stability Board; formerly governor of the Bank of Canada
 Bernard Ebbers (1941–2020), WorldCom co-founder
 Daryl Katz (born 1961), chairman and chief executive officer of the Katz Group; owner of the Edmonton Oilers
 Ray Muzyka (born 1969), co-founder, BioWare Corp
 Ricken Patel (born 1977), founding president and executive director of Avaaz
 Robert Proznik, Canadian businessman
 Barb Tarbox (1961–2003), anti-smoking activist
 Allan Wachowich (born 1935), former Chief Justice of the Court of Queen's Bench of Alberta
 Max Ward (1921–2020), aviator and founder of Wardair airline
 Greg Zeschuk (born 1969), co-founder of BioWare Corp

Religion 
 Seraphim Storheim (born 1946), former senior hierarch for the Orthodox Church in America

Actors 
 Beverly Adams (born 1945), former actress
 Melody Anderson (born 1955), former actress
 Tori Anderson (born 1988), actress
 Chelsey Reist (born 1987), actress
 Nathaniel Arcand (born 1971), actor
 Gary Basaraba (born 1959), actor
 Michelle Beaudoin (born 1975), actress
 Genevieve Buechner (born 1991), actress
 Terry Chen (born 1975), film and television actor
 Rae Dawn Chong (born 1961), Canadian-born American actress; daughter of Maxine Sneed and Tommy Chong
 Tommy Chong (born 1938), comedian, actor and musician
 Ben Cotton (born 1975), film and television actor
 Trevor Devall (born 1972), voice actor, born in Edmonton
 Paula Devicq (born 1965), actress
 Rosemary Dunsmore (born 1953), TV, film, and theatre actress
 Nathan Fillion (born 1971), film and television actor
 Dianne Foster (1928–2019), film and television actress
 Michael J. Fox (born 1961), film and television actor
 Patrick Gilmore (born 1976), film and television actor
 Grace Glowicki, actress and filmmaker
 Robert Goulet (1933–2007), singer and film actor
 Meghan Heffern (born 1983), actress
 Jill Hennessy (born 1968), television actress and musician
 Jimmy Herman (1940–2013), First Nations actor
 Eric Johnson (born 1979), actor
 Keltie Knight (born 1982), professional dancer, television presenter and 1/3 of the LadyGang podcast
 Rochelle Loewen (born 1979), model who appeared briefly with the WWE
 Bruce McCulloch (born 1961), actor, writer, comedian, and film director
 Kathleen McGee, stand-up comedian
 Niall Matter (born 1980), actor
 Leslie Nielsen (1926–2010), film and television actor
Steven Ogg (born 1973), actor
 Ron Pederson (born 1978), stage and screen actor
 Callum Keith Rennie (born 1960), film and television actor
 Lisa Ryder (born 1970), actress
 Kavan Smith (born 1970), actor
 Catherine Mary Stewart (born 1959), film and television actor
 Ryan Stock, TV circus stuntman
 Kenneth Welsh (born 1942), film and television actor

Musicians 

 Violet Archer (1913–2000), composer
 Ruth B (born 1995), singer/songwriter
 H. Hugh Bancroft (1904–1988), church musician and composer
 Tommy Banks (1936–2018), musician
 Moe Berg (born 1959), singer/songwriter
 George Blondheim (1956–2020), pianist and composer
 Bill Bourne (1954-2022), folk and blues singer/songwriter, three-time Juno Award winner
 Harpdog Brown (born 1962), blues musician
 Brox Sisters, singers (Brock sisters)
 Cadence Weapon (Rollie Pemberton; born 1986), rapper
 Beatrice Carmichael (died 1964), grand dame of the opera
 Ken Chinn (a.k.a. Chi Pig; 1962–2020), lead singer, songwriter and band leader of SNFU
 Stu Davis (1921–2007), singer/songwriter/guitarist, internationally known as "Canada's Cowboy Troubadour" 
 Mac DeMarco (born 1990), indie rock musician
 Jean Dubé (born 1981), pianist
 Trevor Dunn (born 1968), guitarist, member of 1970's group Fifth Avenue Allstars
 Tim Feehan (born 1957), artist, singer/songwriter, producer, co-owner of Los Angeles recording studio Backroom, mix master
 Malcolm Forsyth (1936–2011), composer
Jay Fung, singer/songwriter 
 Allan Gilliland (born 1965), composer
 G.NA (Choi Ji-Na; born 1987), Korean singer
 Dwayne Goettel (1964–1995), keyboardist for Skinny Puppy
 Adam Gregory (born 1985), singer
 Brian Hughes (born 1955), smooth jazz guitarist
 Cassius Khan, Indian classical tabla player and ghazal singer, recipient of Salute to Excellence Award
 Samantha King, singer/songwriter
 Morgan Lander, singer/songwriter
 k.d. lang, singer/songwriter
 Ariane Mahrÿke Lemire, singer/songwriter
 Jens Lindemann, trumpet soloist
 Cameron Melnyk, lead singer of Canadian rock band State of Shock
 Big Miller, jazz and blues singer
 Maren Ord, singer/songwriter
 P.J. Perry, jazz saxophonist
 Quanteisha, singer
 Carmen Rasmusen (born 1985), country music artist
 Jan Randall, composer
 Alyssa Reid, singer/songwriter
 Shiloh, singer/songwriter
 Sean Nicholas Savage, indie singer/songwriter
 Jay Sparrow, singer/songwriter
 Mark Spicoluk (born 1979), musician
 Kreesha Turner, singer/songwriter
Ella May Walker, composer
 Alfie Zappacosta, singer/songwriter

Politicians
 William Humberstone (1836–1922), politician in Alberta, and a municipal councillor in Edmonton
 Don Iveson (born 1979), former mayor (predecessor to Amarjeet Sohi)
 Marcel Lambert (1919–2000), politician
 Stephen Mandel (born 1945), mayor
 Rachel Notley (born 1964), 17th Premier of Alberta
 Amarjeet Sohi (born 1964), Member of Parliament and Minister of Natural Resources, 2015–2019, and current mayor of the city of Edmonton. (As of October 2021)

Writers and artists 
 Will Beauchamp, filmmaker
 Ted Bishop, author of Riding with Rilke
 Andrew Brook (born 1943), philosopher, author of Kant and the Mind
 Gil Cardinal (1950–2015), filmmaker
 Judith Clute (born in Edmonton in 1942), painter, graphic designer, print-maker, and illustrator
 Patrick Cox (born 1963), shoe designer
 Gordon R. Dickson (1923–2001), science fiction writer
 Brion Gysin (1916–1986), artist and writer
 W. G. Hardy (1895–1979), professor, writer, ice hockey administrator, Member of the Order of Canada
 Peter Hide (born 1944), British-born sculptor, living in Edmonton since 1977
 Arthur Hiller (1923–2016), Hollywood film director and former president of the Directors Guild of America
 Carl Honoré (born 1967), grew up in Edmonton; journalist and author of In Praise of Slowness
 Mel Hurtig (1932–2016), publisher, author, and politician
 Drew Karpyshyn (born 1971), video game scenario writer, scriptwriter, and novelist
 Conor Kerr (born 1988), author of Avenue of Champions
 W. P. Kinsella, author of Shoeless Joe which became the film Field of Dreams; tournament Scrabble player
 Samuel Edward Konkin III, founder of the libertarian social philosophy agorism
 Myrna Kostash, writer of eight books including All of Baba's Children
 Stewart Lemoine, playwright
 Austin Mardon (born 1962), author, community leader and advocate for the disabled
 Iman Mersal, poet
 Ryan McCourt, visual artist
 Marshall McLuhan, recipient of numerous awards and appointments, pioneer of media theory
 Richard Newman, writer, broadcaster, and reality TV star, best known for participating in the seventh series of the British version of Big Brother
 Wendy Orr (born 1968), Canadian-born Australian writer
 Kelly Oxford, writer, New York Times bestselling author of Everything Is Perfect When You're a Liar
 T. W. Peacocke, television and film director
 Robert Young Pelton, author
 Tom Radford, documentary filmmaker
 Jon Jon Rivero, Filipino Canadian Documentary Producer of Balikbayan Project and Edify Edmonton's Top 40 Under 40 2021 awardee
 Phyllis Seckler (1917–2004), ninth degree (IX°) member of the "Sovereign Sanctuary of the Gnosis" of Ordo Templi Orientis
 Brent Shaw (born 1947), historian
 Gail Sidonie Sobat, poet, novelist, and educator, founder/director of YouthWrite
Ella May Walker, artist and writer

Sports personalities

Bobsledder 
 David Bissett (born 1979), Olympic bobsledder
 Jennifer Ciochetti (born 1984), bobsledder
 Pierre Lueders (born 1970), bobsledder
 Jesse Lumsden (born 1982), bobsledder and football player
 Neville Wright (born 1980), bobsledder

Boxer 

 Al Ford (born 1950), professional boxer and CBF Lightweight Champion
 Ryan Ford (born 1982), professional boxer and retired mixed martial arts fighter
 Kelly Perlette, light middle-weight boxing gold medal at the 1978 Commonwealth Games
 Adam Trupish (born 1979), boxer

Curler 
 Jessica Amundson (born 1984), curler
 Joanne Courtney (born 1989), curler
Randy Ferbey (born 1959), multiple Canadian and World Men's Curling Champion
Heather Kalenchuk (born 1984), curler
 Cathy King (born 1959), curler, from St Albert
 Jamie King (born 1973), curler
 Renée Sonnenberg (born 1971), curler

Ice hockey 
 Shawn Belle (born 1985), former NHL ice hockey defensemen
 Blair Betts (born 1980), ice hockey player
 Roger Bourbonnais (born 1942), ice hockey player
 Jay Bouwmeester (born 1983), ice hockey player
 Johnny Boychuk (born 1984), professional ice hockey defenceman
 Gilbert Brulé (born 1987), ice hockey player
 Johnny Bucyk (born 1935), ice hockey player
 Jason Chimera (born 1979), ice hockey player
 Erik Christensen (born 1983), ice hockey player
 Mac Colville (1916–2003), early star in the NHL
 Neil Colville (1914–1987), early star in the NHL
 Marcel Comeau (born 1952), Canadian ice hockey coach and NHL executive.
 Mike Commodore (born 1978), ice hockey player
 Eric Comrie (born 1995), ice hockey goaltender
 Mike Comrie (born 1980), ice hockey player
 Kirby Dach (born 2001), ice hockey player
 Jake DeBrusk (born 1996), ice hockey player
 Tyler Ennis (born 1989), ice hockey player
 Andrew Ference (born 1979), ice hockey player
 Matt Frattin (born 1988), ice hockey right winger
 Brendan Gallagher (born 1992), ice hockey player
 Donald Gauf (1927–2014), ice hockey player
 Randy Gregg (born 1956), ice hockey player
 W. G. Hardy (1895–1979), President of the Canadian Amateur Hockey Association and the Alberta Amateur Hockey Association
 Greg Hawgood (born 1968), ice hockey defenceman
 Ken Hitchcock (born 1951), ice hockey coach and scout
 Kelly Hrudey (born 1961), ice hockey player
 Jarome Iginla (born 1977), ice hockey player
 Brad Isbister (born 1977), ice hockey player
 Ken Johannson (1930–2018), Canadian-born American ice hockey player, coach and executive
 Dustin Kohn (born 1987), ice hockey player
 John Kordic (1965–1992), ice hockey player
 Daymond Langkow (born 1976), ice hockey player
 Bryan Little (born 1987), ice hockey player
 Jamie Lundmark (born 1981), ice hockey forward
 Joffrey Lupul (born 1983), ice hockey player
 Richard Matvichuk (born 1973), ice hockey player
 Ken McAuley (1921–1992), goaltender for the NHL New York Rangers; husband of Mildred Warwick McAuley
 Mark Messier (born 1961), ice hockey player
 Derek Morris (born 1978), ice hockey player
 Scott Nichol (born 1974), ice hockey player
 Scott Niedermayer (born 1973), ice hockey player
 Ben Ondrus (born 1982), ice hockey player
 Greg Parks (1967–2015), ice hockey player
 Eric Paterson (1929–2014), ice hockey player
 Alex Petrovic (born 1992), ice hockey defenceman
 Matt Pettinger (born 1980), ice hockey player
 Dion Phaneuf (born 1985), ice hockey player
 Fernando Pisani (born 1976), ice hockey player
 Justin Pogge (born 1986), AHL hockey player
 Art Potter (1909–1998), President of the Canadian Amateur Hockey Association and the Alberta Amateur Hockey Association
 Mark Pysyk (born 1992), ice hockey player for the Detroit Red Wings
 Steve Regier (born 1984), ice hockey player
 Steven Reinprecht, ice hockey player
 Kelly Rissling (born 1960), ice hockey player
 David Schlemko (born 1987), ice hockey player
 John Scott, ice hockey player
 Stuart Skinner (born 1998), ice hockey goaltender
 Colin Smith (born 1993), ice hockey player
 Jared Spurgeon (born 1989), ice hockey player
 Jason Strudwick (born 1975), ice hockey player
 Brian Sutherby (born 1982), ice hockey centre
 Darryl Sydor, ice hockey player
 Shannon Szabados (born 1986), ice hockey goaltender
 Cam Ward, ice hockey player
 Darcy Werenka (born 1973), Canadian-Austrian ice hockey defenceman
 Ray Whitney, ice hockey player

Skater 

Jamie Gregg (born 1985), long track speed skater
 Jessica Gregg (born 1988), short track speed skater
Natasha Purich (born 1995), pair skater
Josie Morrison (born 1994), speed skater

Skier 

Stanley Hayer (born 1973), Canadian freestyle skier of Czech descent
 Jennifer Heil (born 1983), freestyle skier born in Spruce Grove, Alberta
Dusty Korek (born 1995), Canadian ski jumper of Polish descent
Stefan Read (born 1987), ski jumper

Soccer player 
 Alphonso Davies (born 2000), soccer player
 Lars Hirschfeld (born 1978), soccer goalkeeper
 Daniel Fernandes (born 1983), Portuguese Canadian professional soccer player
 Stephanie Labbé (born 1986), soccer goalkeeper for the Canadian Women's National Team, Olympic Gold Medalist
 Erin McLeod (born 1983), soccer goalkeeper, Olympic bronze medalist
 Tosaint Ricketts (born 1987), soccer player

Wrestler 

 Chris Benoit (1967–2007), professional wrestler
 Gene Kiniski (1928–2010), professional wrestler

Others 
 Ewan Beaton (born 1969), judoka
 Gary Beck (born 1941), two-time world champion drag racer and member of the Canadian Motorsport Hall of Fame
 Art Boileau (born 1957), Olympic marathon runner
 Robin Clegg (born 1977), biathlete
 Michelle Conn (born 1963), field hockey player
Robert Easton (born 1960 or 1961), Paralympian, wheelchair athlete, won three gold medals at the 1988 Seoul Paralympics
 David Ford (born 1967), kayaker
 Forrest Gainer (born 1979), rugby union player
 Blythe Hartley (born 1982), diver
 Ed Kucy (born 1971), CFL player
 Jason MacDonald (born 1975), UFC fighter
 Mildred Warwick McAuley (1922–2006), All-American Girls Professional Baseball League player; wife of Ken McAuley
Chuba Hubbard (born 1999), NFL running back
 Rod Phillips (born 1941), radio broadcaster for 630 CHED
 Annamay Pierse (born 1983), swimmer born in Toronto and raised in Edmonton
 John "Red" Pollard (1909–1981), jockey of the famous horse Seabiscuit
 Doug Pruden, multiple world records in push ups
 Mike Robertson (born 1985), snowboarder
 Alison Sydor (born 1966), cross country mountain cyclist

Scientists
 John Acorn, naturalist, lecturer at the University of Alberta, research associate at the Royal Tyrrell Museum of Paleontology, and research associate at the E.H. Strickland Entomology Museum
 Karl Clark (1888–1966), University of Alberta professor and inventor of oil sands extraction technology
 Werner Israel (born 1931), physicist
 Raymond Lemieux (1920–2000), organic chemist

 Diane Loranger geologist, paleantologist
 Jordan Peterson (born 1962), clinical psychologist, cultural critic, and professor of psychology at the University of Toronto
 Gary Purdy (born 1936), materials scientist and engineer, professor 
 Gordon Walter Semenoff (born 1953), theoretical physicist

Others
Kerry Pawluski, medical doctor and pilot

See also
List of people from British Columbia
List of people from Calgary
List of people from Montreal
List of people from Ontario
List of people from Quebec
List of people from Quebec City
List of people from Toronto
List of people from Vancouver

References

External links
 Edmonton toasts 100 top citizens of past century

 
Edmonton
Edmonton
People